Flore was a 32-gun frigate of the French Navy, designed by Groignard. She is notable for her scientific voyage in 1771 and 1772, where she tested marine chronometers made by Berthoud, an important step in the History of longitude.

Career 
On 29 October 1771, under Lieutenant Verdun de la Crenne, Flore departed Brest for a scientific voyage intended to test several Marine chronometers:  Berthoud's n°8, Le Roy's watches A and S, and another called "petite ronde" which was not competing for the 1773 prize, as well as further chronometers by Arsandeaux and Biesta. Borda and Pingré were part of the expedition. Flore called Cadiz and Tenerriffe, before continuing on to Gorée, Fort Royal, Cap français, Saint-Pierre et Miquelon, and Copenhagen, before returning to Brest.

Flore took part in the War of American Independence under Castellane-Majastre, ferrying letters between Toulon and America in April 1778.

On 22 October 1781, Flore departed Toulon to take part in the Invasion of Minorca. She returned on 30 November.

Fate 
Flore was condemned at Toulon, and sold in 1787.

Notes, citations, and references 
Notes

Citations

References
 
 

 

External links
 
 

Age of Sail frigates of France
1769 ships
Ships built in France